Judit Magos-Havas (19 February 1951 — 18 October 2018), was a female international table tennis player from Hungary.

Table tennis career
From 1972 to 1982 she won eleven medals in singles, doubles, and team events in the Table Tennis European Championships. This included six gold medals.

She was named Hungarian Sportswoman of the year in 1978 after winning two gold medals at that year's European Championships.

See also
 List of table tennis players

References

1951 births
2018 deaths
Table tennis players from Budapest
Hungarian female table tennis players